Selișteni may refer to:

 Selișteni, a village in Husnicioara Commune, Mehedinți County, [[Romania
 Selișteni, a village in Valea-Trestieni Commune, Nisporeni district, Moldova

See also 
 Seliște (disambiguation)